The Estadio de Mazatlán is a football stadium located in the city of Mazatlán, Sinaloa, Mexico. It was inaugurated in 2020 and has a capacity of approximately 25,000. The stadium is the home of Mazatlán F.C., which began Liga MX play in the Apertura 2020 tournament.

History

In 2017, construction work began on a football stadium in the city of Mazatlán as part of a project to build and modernize various sports venues in the state of Sinaloa. The goal was for a football team to occupy the stadium, though there was no club based in the city. 

In that same year, Pacific F.C. was founded, which belonged to the Faharo Group, owners of Murciélagos F.C. However, during its first tournaments of existence, the team had as its temporary headquarters the city of Los Mochis. It was not until January 2019 that Pacific arrived at Mazatlán, playing at the Estadio Teodoro Mariscal, a baseball stadium. This club would only play in the city for a few months.

In 2020, construction of the stadium was accelerated to have it ready for the start of the 2020–21 football season. Finally, on June 2, the arrival of a new team for the venue was confirmed as Monarcas Morelia were moved from Michoacán and renamed Mazatlán Fútbol Club. The stadium was provisionally named Estadio de Mazatlán. On July 7, 2020, Mazatlán F.C. announced that the stadium will be called El Kraken internally and publicly; however, it officially continues to carry its original name.

On July 27, 2020, the first game at the stadium was held between Mazatlán and Puebla during Week 1 of the Torneo Guardianes 2020, a 4-1 loss for the home side. The first goal at the venue was scored by Puebla's Santiago Ormeño.

See also
List of football stadiums in Mexico
Estadio Teodoro Mariscal

References

External links

Sports venues in Sinaloa
Mazatlán